Bruce William Hayward  (born 1950) is a New Zealand geologist, marine ecologist, and author. He is known as a leading expert on living and fossil foraminifera.

Education and career
At the University of Auckland, Bruce W. Hayward graduated in geology with B.Sc. (Hons) in 1971 and Ph.D. in 1975. In 1976–1977 he was a postdoc at the Smithsonian Institution in Washington, D.C.
Hayward was from 1978 to 1991 a micropaleontologist for the New Zealand Geological Survey, Lower Hutt. In March 1991 Hayward became the curator of marine invertebrates at the Auckland Institute and Museum, after the retirement of Walter Olivier Cernohorsky. From 1997 to 2002 he was a self-employed research associate in the Geology Department of the University of Auckland, as well as from 1998 to 2000 a James Cook Research Fellow at the University of Auckland. In 2003 he became the Founder and Principal Scientist of Geomarine Research, located in Auckland. He was the Principal Scientist for three Marsden Fund grants: from 2000 to 2002 "Foraminifera and paleoceanography of Bounty Trough, east New Zealand", from 2003 to 2005 "The last global marine extinction: causes and consequences for global biodiversity", and from 2007 to 2010 "Causes of evolution and global extinction in the deep sea". In addition to his research on foraminifera, he has done research on "northern New Zealand geology and landforms, marine invertebrate ecology, industrial archaeology and lichens."

Hayward was from 1980 to 1989 an editor for the Geological Society of New Zealand, from 1988 to 2012 an associate editor for the Journal of Foraminiferal Research, and from 2010 chief editor for Foraminifera, World Register of Marine Species. He is founder and convenor (1984–present) of the New Zealand Geopreservation Inventory and from 1990 to 1993 a member of the New Zealand Conservation Authority and from 1993 to 1996 a member of the Auckland Conservation Board.  He co-founded the Offshore Islands Research Group in 1977 and co-founded the Auckland Geology Club in 1993. He is the author or co-author of "over 1000 publications, including more than 280 peer-reviewed papers, hundreds of popular articles, 13 scientific monographs and more than 20 popular books."

Awards and honours
 1978 — McKay Hammer Award of Geological Society of NZ for publications on "Waitakere Ranges geology"
 1988 — New Zealand Association of Scientists Research Medal
 1989–1991 — President of the Geological Society of New Zealand
 2001 — elected Honorary Life Member of New Zealand Marine Sciences Society
 2003 — elected a Fellow of the Royal Society Te Apārangi
 2006 — Hochstetter Lecturer of the Geological Society of New Zealand
 2006 — appointed a Member of the New Zealand Order of Merit (MNZM) in the 2006 Queen's Birthday Honours, for services to earth science and conservation
 2013 — McKay Hammer Award of Geoscience Society of NZ for publications on "The last global extinction (Mid-Pleistocene) of deep-sea benthic foraminifera"
 2013 — elected Honorary Life Member of Geoscience Society of New Zealand.
 2017 — Joseph A. Cushman Medal for Excellence in Foraminiferal Research
 2018 — Hutton Medal of the Royal Society Te Apārangi for "outstanding contributions to the knowledge of New Zealand's marine ecology and geology"

Selected publications

Scientific publications
 
 
 
 
 '

Books
 
 
 
 
 
 
 
 
 
 
 
 
 
 
 
 
  The book recounts "the fascinating geological history of the formation of Northland, Auckland and the Coromandel Peninsula and the history of its past animal and plant life."
  ebook

References

1950 births
Living people
New Zealand paleontologists
New Zealand volcanologists
University of Auckland alumni
Fellows of the Royal Society of New Zealand
20th-century New Zealand scientists
21st-century New Zealand scientists
Members of the New Zealand Order of Merit
People associated with the Auckland War Memorial Museum